István Csoknyai (born 24 October 1964) is a Hungarian former international handball player  and the head coach of Balatonfüredi KSE.

Career

Club
Csoknyai started his career by his hometown club Dunaferr SE in 1983, and except a short spell at Honvéd Szondi SE he stayed until 1990. Dunaferr was a yo-yo club that period and Csoknyai has experienced three relegations (1984, 1986, 1989) and three promotions (1983, 1985, 1987) during his time at the club. Despite playing for a struggling team, his impressive display have convinced KC Veszprém of being a quality player, and the Transdanubians have moved on to sign the back player.

Csoknyai spent fifteen seasons with Veszprém and played a major role in the success story of the team, that have gained near total domination in domestic competitions and also became a top club on continental level. He has won twelve Hungarian championship and as many Hungarian cup titles in these years, completing his collection with an EHF Cup Winners' Cup gold medal. In 2002, he was close to take the most prestigious continental event, the EHF Champions League trophy as well, but Veszprém fell short to SC Magdeburg in the finals.

Three years later, at the age of 40, he finally gave up playing professional handball. He has hold the record of most domestic league and cup titles and most league and continental competition matches amongst the Hungarian players when retired.

Csoknyai did not stay away entirely from the sport, as he took the assistant coach position of Veszprém after his retirement. In 2014 Csoknyai became the head coach of Balatonfüredi KSE, an affiliate team of Veszprém, and took a number of youngsters with him.

From September 2009 to July 2010 he also worked as the head coach of the Hungarian men's national handball team, but under his guidance the team did not perform as it was expected and achieved only a disappointing fourteenth place on the 2010 European Championship.

In 2018, he was appointed again as the coach of the Hungarian national team along with Vladan Matić.

International
Csoknyai, who has been capped 170 times for Hungary, made his international debut on 13 June 1991 against Austria. He participated on the 1992 Summer Olympics a year later, where he played on five games and scored six goals.

He took part on three World Championships (1993, 1997, 1999), capturing the best result in 1997 by finishing fourth. Csoknyai was also present on the European Championship three times in row between 1994 and 1998, achieving a seventh, a tenth and a sixth place, respectively.

He has ended his long international career on 6 June 2004 with a match against Norway.

Personal
He is married and has three children, two son, András (b. 1987) and Balázs (b. 1989) and a daughter, Nóra (b. 1994). All three are handball players.

Achievements
Nemzeti Bajnokság I:
Winner: 1992, 1993, 1994, 1995, 1997, 1998, 1999, 2001, 2002, 2003, 2004, 2005
Magyar Kupa:
Winner: 1992, 1993, 1994, 1995, 1996, 1998, 1999, 2000, 2002, 2003, 2004, 2005
EHF Champions League:
Finalist: 2002
EHF Cup Winners' Cup:
Winner: 1992
Finalist: 1993, 1997
EHF Champions Trophy:
Finalist: 2002, 2008

Individual awards
 Pro Urbe Prize (1992, 2002)
 Life Achievement Award of Veszprém County (2004)

References

External links
István Csoknyai player profile on the European Handball Federation Official Website

1964 births
Living people
Sportspeople from Dunaújváros
Hungarian male handball players 
Hungarian handball coaches
National team coaches 
Olympic handball players of Hungary
Handball players at the 1992 Summer Olympics
Handball coaches of international teams
Veszprém KC players
20th-century Hungarian people